The Ajamaru Lakes rainbowfish (Melanotaenia ajamaruensis) is a species of rainbowfish in the Melanotaeniinae subfamily. It is endemic to the Ayamaru Lakes in West Papua, Indonesia.

References

Sources
 

Ajamaru Lakes rainbowfish
Freshwater fish of Western New Guinea
Fish described in 1980
Taxonomy articles created by Polbot